The Days of Grays is the sixth full-length studio album by Finnish power metal band Sonata Arctica. The album was released in South America on 8 September 2009, on 16 September in Finland, 18 September in Europe and 22 September in North America through Nuclear Blast. The special edition of the album includes the album along with an orchestral CD as a digipak.

It is the first album with guitarist Elias Viljanen and also the first since 1999's Ecliptica in which vocalist Tony Kakko also plays the keyboards.

History 
Sonata Arctica keyboardist Henrik Klingenberg described the album as:

The first single from the album is "The Last Amazing Grays". It was released by Nuclear Blast Records only in Finland on 26 August. The band ran a fan art contest to choose the artwork for their second announced single, "Flag in the Ground" which the press release calls "an uplifting story about a young couple fighting their way to freedom and their own land in North America back in early 1800s." The winner of the contest was Simo Heikkinen from Finland. 
The name for The Days of Grays apparently took a very long time to come to as the band had a name for the record that was deemed more appropriate "for a death metal band or something" according to Henrik Klingenberg. In a French interview, Tony Kakko stated that the original name was Deathaura, the name of a song on the album.

The track "Juliet" continues the so called Caleb saga, a series of songs that started on Silence's "The End of This Chapter", was continued on Reckoning Night's "Don't Say a Word", Unia's "Caleb" and would be later continued on The Ninth Hour's "Till Death's Done Us Apart" and Talviyö's "The Last of the Lambs".

"Everything Fades to Gray" features the lyrics "It's not fair, it's not fair, there was a time now" relating to the Twilight Zone episode Time Enough at Last and "The Truth Is Out There" is about the popular TV series The X-Files.

Track listing 
All music by Tony Kakko except "Nothing More" by Henrik Klingenberg, all lyrics by Tony Kakko, songs arranged by Sonata Arctica.

Personnel
Tony Kakko – vocals, additional keyboards
Elias Viljanen – guitar
Marko Paasikoski – bass guitar
Henrik Klingenberg – keyboards, Hammond
Tommy Portimo – drums
Johanna Kurkela – female vocals (on 2, 9)
Perttu Kivilaakso (Apocalyptica) – Cello (on 1, 6, 11, 12 and "In My Eyes You're a Giant")

Charts

Certifications

Release history

References

Sonata Arctica albums
2009 albums
Nuclear Blast albums